Olivier Strelli born Nissim Israel is a Belgian fashion designer, who put Belgium on the fashion map. His name is now synonymous with a chain of male and female clothing and accessory boutiques in Belgium, Switzerland, France and China. In 2005, Francophone Belgian TV viewers voted Strelli 56th in a list of the 100 greatest Belgians of all time through the show Les plus grands Belges.

Biography
Strelli was born in 1946 in Kinshasa, Belgian Congo the son of Italian and Greek Jews from the island of Rhodes who had migrated there in the early 20th century. The Congo was at that time Belgium's great colonial possession and non-African communities included Greeks and Sephardic-Jews who had fled political unrest in the Balkans. After Congolese Independence, Strelli's family ended up in Belgium where Olivier had studied textile design in Tournai. Based in Brussels from 1974, he created a line of off-the-peg male fashions and later opened his own boutique. His first full-line collection was shown in the Paris season of 1980. Famous clients since have included the Rolling Stones, Brigitte Bardot, Stevie Wonder and several members of the Belgian royal family. The yellow coat worn by Queen Paola during the coronation of her husband King Albert II in 1993 was a Strelli original. He has also designed uniforms for Belgian railway staff  and for air hostesses of the now-defunct Belgian national airline Sabena.

External links
 Official website

References

Other notes taken from the biography : Olivier Strelli, passion et métissages, by Élodie de Sélys, published Éditions La Renaissance du Livre, 2006.

1946 births
20th-century Belgian Jews
21st-century Belgian Jews
Belgian Sephardi Jews
Democratic Republic of the Congo emigrants to Belgium
Belgian people of Greek-Jewish descent
Belgian people of Italian-Jewish descent
Democratic Republic of the Congo Jews
Democratic Republic of the Congo people of Greek-Jewish descent
Democratic Republic of the Congo people of Italian descent
Living people
Belgian fashion designers
People from Kinshasa
African Sephardi Jews